Vanderlei Mascarenhas dos Santos or simply Vanderlei (born October 19, 1982) is a Brazilian footballer.

Vanderlei played for Clube Atlético Bragantino in the Campeonato Brasileiro Série B, scoring one goal in eight appearances.

Notes

1982 births
Living people
Brazilian footballers
Clube Atlético Bragantino players
C.F. Os Belenenses players
América Futebol Clube (RN) players
Association football defenders